Raguhn was a Verwaltungsgemeinschaft ("collective municipality") in the Anhalt-Bitterfeld district, Saxony-Anhalt, Germany. The seat of the Verwaltungsgemeinschaft was in Raguhn. It was disbanded on 1 January 2010.

The Verwaltungsgemeinschaft Raguhn consisted of the following municipalities:

 Altjeßnitz
 Jeßnitz
 Marke
 Raguhn
 Retzau
 Schierau
 Thurland
 Tornau vor der Heide

References

Former Verwaltungsgemeinschaften in Saxony-Anhalt